Marcheno is a town and comune in the province of Brescia, in Lombardy. Neighbouring communes are Casto, Gardone Val Trompia, Lodrino, Lumezzane, Marone, Sarezzo, Tavernole sul Mella, and Zone.  It is located in the Trompia valley.

References

Cities and towns in Lombardy